"Live the Dream" is the eighth single by the Liverpool britpop band Cast, fronted by ex La's bassist John Power.

Formats and track listings
CD single (1)
 "Live the Dream"
 "Effectomatic Who"
 "Hold On" 		
 "Live the Dream" (acoustic)

CD single (2)
 "Live the Dream"
 "Flow"
 "On the Run" (demo)		

7" single
 "Live the Dream"
 "Hold On"
 "Flow"

Personnel
Cast
 John Power – vocals, guitar
 Peter Wilkinson – backing vocals, bass
 Liam "Skin" Tyson – guitar
 Keith O'Neill – drums

Production
 John Leckie – producer
 Mark "Spike" Stent – mixing

Chart performance

References

1997 singles
Cast (band) songs
Songs written by John Power (musician)
Song recordings produced by John Leckie
Polydor Records singles